Bon Voyage is the debut solo extended play (EP) by South Korean singer YooA of the girl group Oh My Girl. It was released by WM Entertainment on September 7, 2020. The album consists of five songs, including the title track of the same name.

Background and release 
On August 25, Newsen reported that YooA was preparing to release a solo album in September. In response to the report, WM Entertainment confirmed that YooA will officially make her solo debut with the release of a mini album on September 7. On August 28, YooA shared a first look of her solo debut on YouTube through an opening trailer titled "Bon Voyage".

A cover image and album preview of the mini album was released on September 1. The track list of the mini album Bon Voyage was revealed on September 3. The mini album includes the title track of the same name with five songs in. 

On September 7, the mini album was released, and a music video for the title track of the same name was released alongside it. YooA also held an online showcase to celebrate the release of her first mini album.

Promotions 
YooA promoted the mini album by performing on several music shows, including Show! Music Core, Inkigayo, The Show, M Countdown, and Music Bank.

Track listing

Charts

Accolades

References 

2020 debut EPs
K-pop EPs